Elder Evils is an official supplement for the 3.5 edition of the Dungeons & Dragons role-playing game.

Contents
It includes new content for epic level characters, in the form of extremely powerful, alien monstrosities intent on destroying the world (and designed as a way of providing game masters a means of ending a current campaign).

The book presents nine “elder evils”:
 Atropus, the World Born Dead (an undead godling in the form of a small moon)
 Father Llymic (an alien monster imprisoned in ice)
 The Hulks of Zoretha (five gargantuan statues)
 The Leviathan (a monster of the deep composed of leftover chaotic energies from creation)
 Pandorym (an evil force from the places between the planes)
 Ragnorra, Mother of Monsters (a hideous malformed monstrosity)
 Sertrous (a vast demonic snake)
 The Worm that Walks (a 30’ tall giant composed of worms and maggots, and connected with the demi-god Kyuss)
 Zargon the Returner (a vicious beast crowned with a solitary horn)

Publication history
Elder Evils was authored by Robert J. Schwalb, with Jason Bulmahn, Greg Gorden, James Jacobs, Rhiannon Louve, Michael McArtor, and Anthony Pryor, and published by Wizards of the Coast in December 2007. The cover artist is Michael Komarck, with interior art by Miguel Coimbra, Daarken, Wayne England, Ralph Horsley, Izzy, Howard Lyon, Michael Phillippi, Skan Srisuwan, Francis Tsai, Franz Vohwinkel, Eva Widermann, and James Zhang.

Other Elder Evils

A 10th Elder Evil, called Shothragot is presented in Dragon #362. It serves the god Tharizdun. The Elder Evil Zurguth, the Feasting Vast, was also in introduced in Dragon issue #358, which describes his accidental creation of the Kaorti.

The D&D book Lords of Madness, published previously (in 2005), also presented Elder Evils (page 27). The five described in that book are all greatly respected by the aboleth. They are provided with the following names:
 Bolothamogg, He Who Watches from Beyond the Stars
 Holashner, the Hunger Below
 Piscaethces, the Blood Queen
 Shothotugg, Eater of Worlds
 Y’chak (the Violet Flame)

Reception
Elder Evils received the silver ENnie Award for Best Monster/Adversary.

Reviews

References

External links
 Review of Elder Evils - RPGnet d20 RPG Game Index

Dungeons & Dragons sourcebooks
ENnies winners
Role-playing game supplements introduced in 2007